Epping Town Football Club is a football club based in Epping, Essex, England, currently playing in the .

History

First incarnation
The original Epping Town were formed in 1888, winning the Woodford & District League in 1913 and 1920. The club joined Division Two East of the Spartan League in 1936. They moved into the Premier Division of the London League in 1955, and were Premier Division champions in 1963–64, the league's last season. They then became founder members of the Greater London League, and were placed in the "A" section. A seventh-place finish in 1964–65 was enough to earn a place in the Premier Division the following season. In 1966–67 they won the league, before joining the Metropolitan League in 1969. They won the league in 1970–71, but at the end of the season the league merged into the Metropolitan–London League, which Epping won at the first attempt. The following season they were runners-up, before winning a second title in 1973–74. They then joined Division Two of the Athenian League, which they won in 1975–76 to earn promotion to Division One. After finishing sixth in Division One the following season, they moved up to Division Two of the Isthmian League. The club resigned from the league at the end of the 1984–85 season due to financial problems and their record was expunged. Epping Town played their final game on 2 May 1985, losing 7–0 at home to Leyton-Wingate.

Second incarnation
Whilst the original Epping Town were in the Athenian League in the 1970s, Coopersale, formed in 1948, competed in the Essex Olympian League. In 1992, seven years after the demise of Epping Town, the club changed their name to Eppingsale. In 1999, the club again changed name, this time to Epping. In 2018, the club renamed themselves to Epping Town, signifying the first time in 33 years the name Epping Town had been used in Non-League football. In 2021, Epping Town were promoted from Division Two to Division One of the Essex Olympian League.

Ground
The original Epping Town club played at Stonards Hill in Epping. The second incarnation of Epping Town also used Stonards Hill as their ground until 2020, before Epping Town Council refused to renew the license for the club to play at the site, forcing Epping Town to groundshare with Epping Upper Clapton Rugby Football Club at Upland Road in Thornwood.

Honours
London League
Premier Division champions 1963–64
Greater London League
Premier Division champions 1966–67
Athenian League
Division Two champions 1975–76
Metropolitan League
Champions 1970–71
Metropolitan–London League
Division One champions 1971–72, 1973–74

Records
Best FA Cup performance: Fourth qualifying round, 1973–74
Best FA Vase performance: Fifth round replay, 1976–77

References

Football clubs in England
Football clubs in Essex
Spartan League
London League (football)
Greater London League
Metropolitan League
Metropolitan–London League
Athenian League
Isthmian League
Essex Olympian Football League
Epping, Essex
Association football clubs established in 1888
Association football clubs established in 1948
Association football clubs established in 2018
1888 establishments in England
1948 establishments in England
2018 establishments in England
Association football clubs disestablished in 1985
1985 disestablishments in England